The Sport Club Internacional won two important titles in the year 2006: Copa Libertadores and Fifa Club World Cup.

Squad

Squad statistics

Libertadores 2006 squad

FIFA Club World Cup 2006 squad

Transfers in

Transfers out

Season 2006

Friendly

Matches

Campeonato Gaúcho

I Fase

Matches

Classification
Group

Results summary

Pld = Matches played; W = Matches won; D = Matches drawn; L = Matches lost;

II Fase

Matches

Classification
Group

Results summary

Pld = Matches played; W = Matches won; D = Matches drawn; L = Matches lost;

Finals

Matches

Copa Libertadores

Group stage

Round of 16

Quarter-finals

Semi-finals

Finals

Campeonato Brasileiro

Matches

Classification

Results summary

Pld = Matches played; W = Matches won; D = Matches drawn; L = Matches lost;

Fifa World Club Cup

Semi-finals

Finals

2006
Internacional
2006